The women's singles Squash event was part of the squash programme and took place between November 18 and 21, at the Asian Games Town Gymnasium.

Schedule
All times are China Standard Time (UTC+08:00)

Results

Final

Top half

Bottom half

References 

Women – Individual

Squash at the 2010 Asian Games